The 2001 All-Ireland Senior Ladies' Football Championship Final was the 28th All-Ireland Final and the deciding match of the 2001 All-Ireland Senior Ladies' Football Championship, an inter-county ladies' Gaelic football tournament for the top teams in Ireland.

The game was tied with seconds left when Mayo were penalised for not hitting a kickout far enough, and Laois pointed the free to win their first title, having lost seven finals prior to this.

References

All-Ireland Senior Ladies' Football Championship Finals
All-Ireland
Mayo county ladies' football team matches
Laois county ladies' football team matches